= Amazon Light =

Amazon user interface

Amazon Light was an alternate user interface to Amazon.com built on the Amazon Web Services API. The site was developed by Alan Taylor, a former Amazon programmer, while he still worked for the company. The site was funded through Amazon affiliate links.

The website was intended to be a simpler and more efficient way to access Amazon.com and use its features. It allowed the user to search or browse Amazon's database of books, music, DVDs, and VHS tapes, and add items into a list. The list was then used to add the items into the user's Amazon.com shopping cart where they could then be purchased.

Amazon Light originally used a layout which resembled the main page of the Google search engine. In July 2002, Google's lawyers told it to cease and desist.

Amazon Light 4.0 won the "Technical Achievement award" at the South by Southwest Web Awards in 2005.

In July 2009, Alan Taylor announced on his blog that "Amazon Light (all four versions) will shut down."
